Archaeus is an extinct genus of jackfish from the Paleogene of Europe.  The oldest species, A. oblongus is from the late/terminal Thanetian epoch of Paleocene Turkmenistan, and the last species, A. glarisianus and possibly A. brevis, are from the early to middle Rupelian, of the Oligocene lagerstatten of Canton Glarus, Switzerland.
In life, Archaeus species would have resembled a small trevally, though, Archaeus had a proportionally smaller mouth, and larger eyes, and the tail was more fan-shaped, rather than crescent-shaped.

References
 Catalogue of the fossil fishes in the British museum (Natural history) 
 PROKOFIEV Artém M. The Late Paleocene fish fauna of Turkmenistan

Paleocene fish
Eocene fish
Oligocene fish
Thanetian genus first appearances
Rupelian genus extinctions
Carangidae
Paleogene fish of Europe
Paleogene fish of Asia
Fossil taxa described in 1834